Emblemaria walkeri, the Elusive signal blenny, is a species of chaenopsid blenny found in the Gulf of California, in the eastern central Pacific ocean. It can reach a maximum length of  TL. This species feeds primarily on zooplankton. The specific name honours fisheries biologist Boyd W. Walker (1917-2001) of the University of California, Los Angeles.

References
 Stephens, J.S. Jr., 1963 (31 Dec.) A revised classification of the blennioid fishes of the American family Chaenopsidae. University of California Publications in Zoology v. 68: 1–165, Pls. 1-15.

walkeri
Fish described in 1963